John Doeg defeated Frank Shields 10–8, 1–6, 6–4, 16–14 in the final to win the men's singles tennis title at the 1930 U.S. National Championships. Reigning champion Bill Tilden lost to Doeg in the semifinals.

Seeds
The tournament used two lists of eight players for seeding the men's singles event; one for U.S. players and one for foreign players. John Doeg is the champion; others show the round in which they were eliminated.

  Bill Tilden (semifinals)
  Wilmer Allison (fourth round)
  George Lott (quarterfinals)
  Sidney Wood (semifinals)
  Clifford Sutter (quarterfinals)
  John Doeg (champion)
  Gregory Mangin (quarterfinals)
  John Van Ryn (quarterfinals)
  Jean Borotra (first round)
  Harry Lee (fourth round)
  John Olliff (fourth round)
  Fred Perry (fourth round)
  George Lyttleton-Rogers (fourth round)
  Marcel Rainville (second round)
  E.R. Avory (third round)
  Leslie Godfree (fourth round)

Draw

Final eight

Top half

Section 1

Section 2

References

Men's singles
1930